Guernsey competed at the 2022 Commonwealth Games in Birmingham, England between 28 July and 8 August 2022. Having made its Games debut in 1970, it was Guernsey's fourteenth appearance to date.

Guernsey's team consisted of 28 athletes. Cyclist Marc Cox and badminton player Elena Johnson were the country's flagbearers during the opening ceremony.

Lawn bowler Lucy Beere won the territory's first medal in 28 years, by winning the silver medal in the women's singles event.

Medallists

Competitors
Guernsey received a quota of 28 open allocation slots from Commonwealth Sport. This quota is used to determine the overall team in sports lacking a qualifying system.

The following is the list of number of competitors participating at the Games per sport/discipline.

Athletics

Two athletes were officially selected on 11 November 2021, with three others added on 4 March 2022.

Men
Track and road events

Women
Track and road events

Badminton

Four players were officially selected on 4 March 2022.

Boxing

One boxer (Billy Le Poullain) was officially selected on 4 March 2022.

Men

Cycling

Three cyclists were officially selected on 11 November 2021, with three others added on 4 March 2022.

Road
Men

Mountain Biking

Lawn bowls

Four players were officially selected on 4 March 2022.

Men

Women

Swimming

Eight swimmers were officially selected on 4 March 2022.

Men

Women

Mixed

Triathlon

One triathlete was officially selected on 11 November 2021.

Individual

References

External links
Commonwealth Games Guernsey Official site

Nations at the 2022 Commonwealth Games
Guernsey at the Commonwealth Games
2022 in Guernsey